Bball Córdoba is a Basketball team based in Córdoba, Andalusia. The team currently plays in league Liga EBA.

History
Bball Córdoba was founded in 2008 with the name of Club Deportivo Baloncesto Córdoba 2016, as a merger of the two top teams in the city, when they were playing LEB Bronce:

 CB Juventud de Córdoba (former LEB Oro team)
 CB Ciudad de Córdoba

The team played in LEB Plata until it was relegated to Liga EBA in 2010. Later, in 2012, the club changed was renamed as Bball Córdoba, its current denomination.

In 2016, the team was not admitted in Liga EBA and subsequently registered in Primera División, one tier below.

Season by season

Juventud de Córdoba

Ciudad de Córdoba

Bball Córdoba

References

External links
Official website

Basketball teams in Andalusia
Liga EBA teams
Former LEB Plata teams
Former LEB Oro teams
Sport in Córdoba, Spain